Augustus Henry FitzRoy, 3rd Duke of Grafton,  (28 September 173514 March 1811), styled Earl of Euston between 1747 and 1757, was a British Whig statesman of the Georgian era. He is one of a handful of dukes who have served as prime minister.

He became prime minister in 1768 at the age of 33, leading the supporters of William Pitt, and was the youngest person to hold the office until the appointment of William Pitt the Younger 15 years later. However, he struggled to demonstrate an ability to counter increasing challenges to Britain's global dominance following the nation's victory in the Seven Years' War. He was widely attacked for allowing France to annex Corsica, and stepped down in 1770, handing over power to Lord North.

Background and education
He was a son of Lord Augustus FitzRoy, a captain in the Royal Navy, and Elizabeth Cosby, the daughter of Colonel William Cosby, who served as a colonial Governor of New York. His father was the third son of the 2nd Duke of Grafton and Lady Henrietta Somerset, which made FitzRoy a great-grandson of both the 1st Duke of Grafton and the Marquess of Worcester. He was notably a fourth-generation descendant of King Charles II and the 1st Duchess of Cleveland; the surname FitzRoy stems from this illegitimacy. His younger brother was the 1st Baron Southampton. Since the death of his uncle in 1747, he has been styled Earl of Euston as his grandfather's heir apparent.

Lord Euston was educated at Newcome's School in Hackney and at Westminster School, made the Grand Tour, and obtained a degree at Peterhouse, University of Cambridge.

Political career
In 1756, he entered Parliament as MP for Boroughbridge, a pocket borough; several months later, he switched constituencies to Bury St Edmunds, which was controlled by his family. However, a year later, his grandfather died, and he succeeded as the 3rd Duke of Grafton, which elevated him to the House of Lords.

He first became known in politics as an opponent of Lord Bute, a favourite of King George III. Grafton aligned himself with the Duke of Newcastle against Lord Bute, whose term as prime minister was short-lived largely because it was felt that the peace terms to which he had agreed at the Treaty of Paris were not a sufficient return for Britain's performance in the Seven Years' War.

In 1765, Grafton was appointed a Privy Counsellor; then, following discussions with William Pitt the Elder, he was appointed Northern Secretary in Lord Rockingham's first government. However, he retired the following year, and Pitt (by then Lord Chatham) formed a ministry in which Grafton was First Lord of the Treasury but not the prime minister.

On September 20, 1769, he was appointed a Knight of the Order of the Garter.

Prime minister

Chatham's illness, at the end of 1767, resulted in Grafton becoming the government's effective leader (he is credited with entering the office of prime minister in 1768), but political differences, the impact of the Corsican Crisis and the attacks of "Junius" led to his resignation in January 1770. Also, in 1768, Grafton became Chancellor of Cambridge University. He became Lord Privy Seal in Lord North's ministry (1771) but resigned in 1775, being in favour of conciliatory action towards the American colonists. In the second Rockingham ministry of 1782, he was again Lord Privy Seal and continued in the post in the following Shelburne ministry until March 1783.

Religious interests
In later years, he was a prominent Unitarian, being one of the early members of the inaugural Essex Street Chapel under Rev. Theophilus Lindsey when it was founded in 1774. Grafton had associated with a number of liberal Anglican theologians when at Cambridge, and devoted much time to theological study and writing after leaving office as prime minister. In 1773, in the House of Lords, he supported a bill to release Anglican clergy from subscribing to all the Thirty-nine Articles. He became a supporter of moral reform among the wealthy and of changes to the church. He was the author of:

Hints Submitted to the Serious Attention of the Clergy, Nobility and Gentry, by a Layman (1789).
Serious Reflections of a Rational Christian from 1788–1797.

He was a sponsor of Richard Watson's Consideration of the Expediency of Revising the Liturgy and Articles of the Church of England (published in 1790), and he funded the printing of 700 copies of Griesbach's edition of the Greek New Testament in 1796.

Horseracing

The Duke also had horse racing interests. His racing colours were sky blue, with a black cap.

Legacy

Grafton County, New Hampshire, in the United States, is named in his honour, as is the city of Grafton, New South Wales, Australia, the town of Grafton, New York, the unincorporated community of Grafton, Virginia, and possibly the township (since 1856 a city) of Grafton, West Virginia. The Grafton Centre Shopping Mall in Cambridge is also named after him and indeed lies on Fitzroy Street. Cape Grafton in Far North Queensland was named after him by Lieutenant James Cook during his first voyage of discovery.

Grafton had the longest post-premiership of any prime minister in British history, totalling .

Family

On 29 January 1756, he married The Hon. Anne Liddell, daughter of Henry Liddell, 1st Baron Ravensworth (1708–1784), at Lord Ravensworth's house in St James's Square, by licence. The marriage was witnessed by Lord Ravensworth and Francis Seymour-Conway, 1st Earl of Hertford.

Augustus and Anne had three children:
 Lady Georgiana FitzRoy (8 May 175718 January 1799), who married John Smyth (12 February 174812 February 1811) on 4 June 1778.
 George Henry FitzRoy, 4th Duke of Grafton (1760–1844)
 General Lord Charles FitzRoy (14 July 176420 December 1829), who married, firstly, Frances Mundy (17739 August 1797) on 20 June 1795, and had one son. He married, secondly, Lady Frances Stewart (24 June 17779 February 1810) on 10 March 1799 and had three children. His sons Sir Charles FitzRoy (1796–1858), governor of New South Wales, and Robert FitzRoy, the hydrographer, were notable for their achievements.

In 1764, the Duke had a very public affair with the courtesan Nancy Parsons whom he kept at his townhouse and took to the opera, where they allegedly were found in flagrante delicto. This brazen lack of convention offended society's standards.  After the Duchess had become pregnant by her own lover, the Earl of Upper Ossory, she and the Duke were divorced by Act of Parliament, passed 23 March 1769. Three months later, on 24 June 1769, the Duke married Elizabeth Wrottesley (1 November 174525 May 1822), daughter of the Reverend Sir Richard Wrottesley, Dean of Worcester. They had the following children:
 Lord Henry FitzRoy (9 April 17707 June 1828), clergyman; he married Caroline Pigot (died 1 January 1835) on 10 September 1800 and had five children. Ancestor of Daisy Greville, Countess of Warwick.
 Lord Frederick FitzRoy (born 16 September 1774; died young).
 Lady Augusta FitzRoy (177929 June 1839), who married Rev. George F. Tavel (died 1829) on 19 November 1811.
 Lady Frances FitzRoy (1 June 17807 January 1866), who married the 1st Baron Churchill on 25 November 1800.
 Admiral Lord William FitzRoy (1 June 178213 May 1857), who married Georgiana Raikes (died 2 December 1861) in 1816 and had two children.
 Lord John Edward FitzRoy (24 September 178528 December 1856), MP, died unmarried.
 Lady Charlotte FitzRoy (died 23 June 1857).
 Lady Elizabeth FitzRoy (died 13 March 1839), who married her cousin Lt. Gen. The Hon. William FitzRoy (1773–1837), son of the 1st Baron Southampton, on 4 July 1811.
 Lady Isabella FitzRoy (died 10 December 1866), who married Barrington Pope Blachford (3 December 178314 May 1816) on 11 August 1812.

Grafton is thus the first British prime minister before Anthony Eden (and one of only three) to have been divorced, and the second, after Robert Walpole, to marry while in office. Grafton would be the only prime minister to divorce and remarry while in office until Boris Johnson in 2021.
FitzRoy died on 14 March 1811.

Arms

Cabinet of the Duke of Grafton

Notes

Bibliography

Further reading

External links
The Third Duke of Grafton
More about Augustus Henry Fitzroy, Duke of Grafton on the 10 Downing Street website.

Alumni of Peterhouse, Cambridge
British officials in the American Revolution
British racehorse owners and breeders
Chancellors of the University of Cambridge
103
Earls of Arlington
Knights of the Garter
Lord-Lieutenants of Suffolk
Lords Privy Seal
Euston, Augustus Fitzroy, Earl of
Members of the Privy Council of Great Britain
People educated at Westminster School, London
Prime Ministers of Great Britain
Secretaries of State for the Northern Department
1735 births
1811 deaths
A
Boroughbridge
18th-century heads of government
British MPs 1754–1761
Owners of Epsom Derby winners
English Unitarians
MPs for rotten boroughs
Leaders of the House of Lords